The British Rail Class 103 diesel multiple units were built by Park Royal Vehicles with diesel engines by British United Traction (BUT).  Ordered in the first half of 1955, 20 of these sets were built by Park Royal at the Crossley Motors works in Stockport of the ACV Group. They consisted of a power car and a driving trailer. Standard BUT equipment was fitted, with 'A' type engines.

A two-car set with 16 first class and 100 second class seats weighed just under 60 long tons, representing 1,150 lb (520 kg) a seat and had 5 hp per ton of empty weight or 4.35 hp per ton when full.

Orders

Operations
They were allocated new to the London Midland Region of British Railways, spending most of their time at Chester. The first deliveries went to traffic in the Llandudno area, allocated to Llandudno Junction in early 1958. This is believed to be an indirect consequence of unit shortages as a result of bogie problems with the BRCW units [Trains Illustrated 1958]. By the end of the same year they were all allocated to Ryecroft for the routes radiating from Walsall. These services were dieselised on 17 November that year [Trains Illustrated Jan 1959 p53]. The last four sets, including W50413 and W56169 the surviving full set, were transferred to the Western Region of British Railways, and worked on the Kingswear Branch having been based out of Laira Depot. Although considered non-standard, owing to their bodywork construction, their use of standard BUT equipment and blue square coupling code allowed them to operate with other classes.

They spent some time in the Watford area, working the St Albans and Belmont branches after the demise of the ACV/BUT "flying brick" railcars. Three units were transferred for this service in December 1958, according to Trains Illustrated [Feb 1959 p110].

Accidents and incidents
On 8 May 1972 an oil train 'ran away' and crashed in Chester General station. M50407 and M56154 were in an adjacent platform and damaged beyond repair.

Liveries
They were delivered in Brunswick green with cream lining, red bufferbeam and pale grey roof. The first sets were delivered without "speed whiskers" (a decorative device on the front). Plain blue with yellow ends was later applied, initially with just a small yellow panel.

Decline
The bodywork became troublesome in service, seeing many withdrawn early. By the end of 1972 there were only 12 power and 14 trailers left in service. The last power car was withdrawn in December 1982, and the last trailer in February 1983.

Preservation
Due to asbestos insulation, only three Class 103 vehicles survive in preservation. 50413 and 56169 are currently being restored by the Helston Railway Diesel Group for use on the Helston branch line. 56160 is privately preserved. Three other vehicles were preserved but have since been scrapped.

References

External links

 The Railcar Association

103
Park Royal Vehicles multiple units
Train-related introductions in 1957